Lagunillas may refer to the following places:

 Bolivia
Lagunillas, Santa Cruz, Bolivia

 Chile
Lagunillas, Chile

 Mexico
Lagunillas, Jalisco
Lagunillas, Michoacán, Mexico
Lagunillas, San Luis Potosí, Mexico
Lagunillas Municipality, Michoacán, Mexico
Lagunillas Municipality, San Luis Potosí, Mexico

 Venezuela
Lagunillas, Mérida, Venezuela
Lagunillas Municipality, Zulia, Venezuela

See also 
Lagunilla, Province of Salamanca, Spain
Lagunilla del Jubera, La Rioja, Spain
La Lagunilla Market, in Mexico City
Lagunilla metro station, in Mexico City
Garibaldi / Lagunilla metro station, in Mexico City
San Pedro Lagunillas, Nayarit, Mexico